The 2021 South American Aerobic Gymnastics Championships were held in Ibagué, Colombia, from November 9 to 14, 2021. The competition was organized by the Colombian Gymnastics Federation and approved by the International Gymnastics Federation.

Medalists

References

2021 in gymnastics
International gymnastics competitions hosted by Colombia
2021 in Colombian sport
South American Gymnastics Championships
South American Aerobic Gymnastics Championships